Incumbent provincial governors of the Philippines were elected on May 9, 2022, and took oath of office on June 30, 2022. The current term will expire on June 30, 2025, as mandated by the Local Government Code.

Luzon

Ilocos Region

Cagayan Valley

Cordillera Administrative Region

Central Luzon

Calabarzon

Mimaropa

Bicol Region

Visayas

Western Visayas

Central Visayas

Eastern Visayas

Mindanao

Zamboanga Peninsula

Northern Mindanao

Davao Region

Soccsksargen

Caraga

Bangsamoro

References

See also
For a list of vice governors, see Provincial boards in the Philippines#List
Governor of Metro Manila, defunct position
Politics of the Philippines
Governor-General of the Philippines
Governor of the Autonomous Region in Muslim Mindanao, head of the defunct Autonomous Region in Muslim Mindanao.
Chief Minister of Bangsamoro

Governors
Philippines
Philippines,governors